Pentacora signoreti is a species of shore bug in the family Saldidae. It is found in the Caribbean Sea, Central America, and North America.

Subspecies
These two subspecies belong to the species Pentacora signoreti:
 Pentacora signoreti signoreti (Guérin-Méneville, 1857)
 Pentacora signoreti yucatana Hodgden, 1949

References

External links

 

Articles created by Qbugbot
Insects described in 1857
Chiloxanthinae